Prunella Margaret Rumney West Scales  (née Illingworth; born 22 June 1932) is an English former actor, best known for playing Sybil Fawlty, wife of Basil Fawlty (John Cleese), in the BBC comedy Fawlty Towers; for her portrayal of Queen Elizabeth II in A Question of Attribution (Screen One, BBC 1991) by Alan Bennett (for which she was nominated for a BAFTA award); and for the documentary series Great Canal Journeys (2014–2021), in which she travels on canal barges and narrowboats with her husband, fellow actor Timothy West.

Early life
Scales was born in Sutton Abinger, Surrey, the daughter of Catherine (née Scales), an actress, and John Richardson Illingworth, a cotton salesman. She attended Moira House Girls' School, Eastbourne. Scales had a younger brother, Timothy "Timmo" Illingworth (1934–2017).

In 1939, at the start of the Second World War, Scales's parents moved with their children to Bucks Mill near Bideford in Devon. Scales herself and her brother were evacuated to Near Sawrey in Lancashire.

Career

Early works and career break 
Scales started her career in 1951 as an assistant stage manager at the Bristol Old Vic. But she has stated "I have always wanted to be an actor". Throughout her career, she has often been cast in comic roles. Her early work included the (now believed to be lost) second UK adaptation of Pride and Prejudice (1952), Laxdale Hall (1953), Hobson's Choice (1954), Room at the Top (1959) and Waltz of the Toreadors (1962).

Her career break came with the early 1960s sitcom Marriage Lines starring opposite Richard Briers. She played her most famous role, Sybil Fawlty in the sitcom Fawlty Towers, over two series in 1975 and 1979. In addition to this, she has had roles in BBC Radio 4 sitcoms, and comedy series including After Henry, Smelling of Roses and Ladies of Letters; on television she starred in the London Weekend Television/Channel 4 series Mapp & Lucia based on the novels by E. F. Benson. She played Queen Elizabeth II in Alan Bennett's A Question of Attribution.

In 1973, Scales was cast with Ronnie Barker in One Man's Meat which formed part of Barker's Seven of One series, also for the BBC. Her later film appearances include Escape from the Dark (1976), The Hound of the Baskervilles (1978), The Boys From Brazil (1978), The Wicked Lady (1983), The Lonely Passion of Judith Hearne (1987), Consuming Passions (1988), A Chorus of Disapproval (1989), Howards End (1992), Wolf (1994), An Awfully Big Adventure (1995) and Stiff Upper Lips (1997). For the BBC Television Shakespeare production of The Merry Wives of Windsor (1982) she played Mistress Page and in the Theatre Night series (BBC) she appeared with her husband Timothy West in the Joe Orton farce What the Butler Saw (1987) playing Mrs Prentice.

1990s and onwards 
For ten years, Scales appeared as "Dotty" Turnbull, together with Jane Horrocks as her character's daughter, Kate Neall, in advertisements for UK supermarket chain Tesco. In 1996, Scales starred in the television film Lord of Misrule, alongside Richard Wilson, Emily Mortimer and Stephen Moyer. The film was directed by Guy Jenkins and filming took place in Fowey in Cornwall. The same year, she appeared as Miss Bates in Jane Austen's Emma. In 1997, Scales starred in Chris Barfoot's science-fiction film short Phoenix which was first aired in 1999 by NBCUniversal's Sci-Fi Channel. Scales played The Client, an evil government minister funding inter-genetic time travel experiments. The same year, she played Minny Stinkler in the comedy film Mad Cows, directed by Sara Sugarman. In 1993 Scales voiced Mrs Tiggy-Winkle in The World of Peter Rabbit and Friends.

In 2000, Scales appeared in the film The Ghost of Greville Lodge as Sarah. The same year, she appeared as Eleanor Bunsall in Midsomer Murders "Beyond the Grave". In 2001, she appeared in two episodes of Silent Witness "Faith" as Mrs Parker. In 2003, she appeared as Hilda, "she who must be obeyed", wife of Horace Rumpole, in four BBC Radio 4 plays, with Timothy West playing her fictional husband. Scales and West toured Australia at the same time in different productions. Scales appeared in a one-woman show called An Evening with Queen Victoria, which also featured the tenor Ian Partridge singing songs written by Prince Albert. Scales has performed An Evening with Queen Victoria more than 400 times, in theatres around the world, over the course of 30 years.

Scales voiced the speaking ("cawing") role of Magpie, the eponymous thief in a 2003 recording of Gioachino Rossini's opera La gazza ladra (The Thieving Magpie).

In 2006, Scales appeared alongside Academy Award winners Vanessa Redgrave and Maximilian Schell in the mini-series The Shell Seekers.

Later years 
On 16 November 2007, Scales appeared in Children in Need, reprising her role as Sybil Fawlty, the new manager who wants to take over Hotel Babylon. John Cleese said in an interview on 8 May 2009 that the role of Sybil Fawlty was originally offered to Bridget Turner, who turned down the part, claiming "it wasn't right for her".

Scales appeared in the audio play The Youth of Old Age, produced in 2008 by the Wireless Theatre Company, and available to download free of charge on their website. In 2008, she appeared in Agatha Christie's Miss Marple "A Pocket Full of Rye" as Mrs Mackenzie.

Scales appeared in a production of Carrie's War, the Nina Bawden novel, at the West End Apollo Theatre in 2009. The run was successful despite middling reviews. However, Ben Bradley, writing for The New York Times Arts & Beats, stated that Scales was the most memorable thing about the show, "[playing] a rich, Miss Havisham-like eccentric, who trails through her house in evening gowns".

Scales starred in the 2011 British live-action 3D family comedy film Horrid Henry: The Movie as the titular character's Great Aunt Greta. She appeared in a short audio story, Dandruff Hits the Turtleneck, written by John Mayfield, and available for download. Scales starred in a short film called "Stranger Danger" alongside Roderick Cowie in 2012. In 2013 she made a guest appearance in the popular BBC radio comedy Cabin Pressure as Wendy Crieff, the mother of Captain Martin Crieff.

Alongside her husband, Scales appeared in Great Canal Journeys for Channel 4 from 2014 for ten series, before her deteriorating health brought her television career to an end. Stuart Heritage, writing for The Guardian in November 2016, commented that it "is ultimately a work about a devoted couple facing something huge together. It's a beautiful, meditative programme". "An emotional but unrooted glimpse of life with dementia" was Christopher Howse's characterization in October 2018, writing for The Telegraph. Reviewing Scales' and West's last episode in October 2019 for The Guardian, Jack Seale wrote "Since the first instalment in 2014, the series has charted the long, slow goodbye that is living with dementia, cherishing every moment of precious normality and celebrating how an immersion in nature is the surest way to bring the old Pru back."

Personal life
In 1992 Scales appeared on BBC Radio 4's Desert Island Discs. Her chosen book was the Complete Works of Shakespeare in German, the Bible in Russian, and a Russian dictionary; her luxury item was "a huge tapestry kit".

Her biography, Prunella, written by Teresa Ransom, was published by UK publishing imprint John Murray in 2005.

In 2005, she named the P&O cruise ship Artemis.

A rose-breeder has created a rose, Prunella, in her honour.

Scales is a patron of the Lace Market Theatre in Nottingham.

Family 
Scales is married to the actor Timothy West, with whom she has two sons; the elder is actor and director Samuel West. Their younger son Joseph participated in two episodes of Great Canal Journeys filmed in France. Scales also has a step-daughter, Juliet, by West's first marriage.

Charity work 
Scales has been an ambassador for SOS Children's Villages charity, an international orphan charity providing homes and mothers for orphaned and abandoned children. She also supports the charity's annual World Orphan Week campaign, which takes place each February.

Alzheimer's disease 
In March 2014, Scales's husband told The Guardian that she had been diagnosed with Alzheimer's disease. The couple discussed practical measures in a radio programme about age and dementia on BBC Radio 4 in December 2014. In June 2018, her husband characterised her short-term memory as "no good at all", and acknowledged that  her condition "slowed them down", but "not so it closes up opportunities." In January 2020 it was announced that, due to Scales's deteriorating health, she and West had no choice but to bring her 67-year career to an end.

Honours

Scales was appointed a Commander of the Order of the British Empire in the 1992 Birthday Honours List. Her husband had received the same honour in the 1984 Birthday Honours List.

References

External links

1932 births
Living people
People from Mole Valley (district)
Commanders of the Order of the British Empire
Actresses from Surrey
English stage actresses
English radio actresses
Television personalities from Surrey
English television actresses
English film actresses
English voice actresses
20th-century English actresses
21st-century English actresses
British waterways activists
People with Alzheimer's disease
Labour Party (UK) people
British comedy actresses